Sarita Handa is an Indian online marketplace for furniture and home décor. The company was founded in 1992 and headquartered in Delhi. The company started with a bank loan of INR 10 lakh from Canara Bank.

History
Sarita Handa was founded by Sarita Handa in February 1992. In 2004, The company opened its first retail store in Delhi. Later, Handa opened 3 retail stores in Mumbai and Chennai.

Awards
Sarita Handa invited to be part of Cannes Lions Festival, 2014, and joint winner of EDIDA's Award 2017 in bedroom category.

References 

Furniture retailers of India
Retail companies established in 1992